A paradoxical reaction (or paradoxical effect) is an effect of a chemical substance, such as a medical drug, that is opposite to what would usually be expected. An example of a paradoxical reaction is pain caused by a pain relief medication.

Paradoxical reactions may be more common in people with ADHD.

Substances

Amphetamines
Amphetamines are a class of psychoactive drugs that are stimulants. Paradoxical drowsiness can sometimes occur in adults. Research from the 1980s popularized the belief that ADHD stimulants such as amphetamine have a calming affect in individuals with ADHD, but opposite effects in the general population. New research however disputes this claim, suggesting that ADHD stimulants have similar affects in adults with and without ADHD.

Antibiotics
The paradoxical effect or Eagle effect (named after Harry Eagle who first described it) refers to an observation of an increase in survivors, seen when testing the activity of an antimicrobial agent. Initially when an antibiotic agent is added to a culture media, the number of bacteria that survive drops, as one would expect. But after increasing the concentration beyond a certain point, the number of bacteria that survive, paradoxically, increases.

Antidepressants
In rare cases antidepressants can make users obsessively violent or have suicidal compulsions, which is in marked contrast to their intended effect. This can be regarded as a paradoxical reaction but, especially in the case of suicide, may in at least some cases be merely due to differing rates of effect with respect to different symptoms of depression: If generalized overinhibition of a patient's actions enters remission before that patient's dysphoria does and if the patient was already suicidal but too depressed to act on their inclinations, the patient may find themself in the situation of being both still dysphoric enough to want to commit suicide but newly free of endogenous barriers against doing so. Children and adolescents are more sensitive to paradoxical reactions of self-harm and suicidal ideation while taking antidepressants but cases are still very rare.

Antipsychotics
Chlorpromazine, an antipsychotic and antiemetic drug which is classed as a "major" tranquilizer, may cause paradoxical effects such as agitation, excitement, insomnia, bizarre dreams, aggravation of psychotic symptoms and toxic confusional states.

These may be more common in elderly dementia patients. Apparent worsening of dementia may be due to the anticholinergic side effects of many antipsychotics.

Barbiturates
Phenobarbital can cause hyperactivity in children. This may follow after a small dose of 20 mg, on condition of no phenobarbital administered in previous days. Prerequisity for this reaction is a continued sense of tension. The mechanism of action is not known, but it may be started by the anxiolytic action of the phenobarbital.

Barbiturates such as pentobarbital have been shown to cause paradoxical hyperactivity in an estimated 1% of children, who display symptoms similar to the hyperactive-impulsive subtype of attention deficit hyperactivity disorder. Intravenous caffeine administration can return these patients' behaviour to baseline levels.

Benzodiazepines
Benzodiazepines, a class of psychoactive drugs called the "minor" tranquilizers, have varying hypnotic, sedative, anxiolytic, anticonvulsant, and muscle relaxing properties, but they may create the exact opposite effects. Susceptible individuals may respond to benzodiazepine treatment with an increase in anxiety, aggressiveness, agitation, confusion, disinhibition, loss of impulse control, talkativeness, violent behavior, and even convulsions. Paradoxical adverse effects may even lead to criminal behavior. Severe behavioral changes resulting from benzodiazepines have been reported including mania, schizophrenia, anger, impulsivity, and hypomania.

Paradoxical rage reactions due to benzodiazepines occur as a result of an altered level of consciousness, which generates automatic behaviors, anterograde amnesia and uninhibited aggression. These aggressive reactions may be caused by a disinhibiting serotonergic mechanism.

Paradoxical effects of benzodiazepines appear to be dose related, that is, likelier to occur with higher doses.

In a letter to the British Medical Journal, it was reported that a high proportion of parents referred for actual or threatened child abuse were taking medication at the time, often a combination of benzodiazepines and tricyclic antidepressants. Many mothers described that instead of feeling less anxious or depressed, they became more hostile and openly aggressive towards the child as well as to other family members while consuming tranquilizers. The author warned that environmental or social stresses such as difficulty coping with a crying baby combined with the effects of tranquilizers may precipitate a child abuse event.

Self aggression has been reported and also demonstrated in laboratory conditions in a clinical study. Diazepam was found to increase people's willingness to harm themselves.

Benzodiazepines can sometimes cause a paradoxical worsening of EEG readings in patients with seizure disorders.

Caffeine 
Caffeine is believed by many to cause paradoxical calmness or sedation in individuals with ADHD. There is insufficient evidence to determine if sedation caused by caffeine is due to a true paradoxical reaction, or rather from dehydration and sleep deprivation caused by the caffeine. Furthermore there are no conclusive studies showing a different affect of caffeine on individuals with ADHD compared to the general population.

Naltrexone 
Naltrexone blocks the opioid receptors, acting opposite to most opioid pain medications. It can be used to negate the effects of opioid painkillers. At doses around one-tenth of the typical dose, naltrexone has been used for pain relief. Low-dose naltrexone is believed to have an inflammatory affect. This is an off label use and not widely accepted by the medical and scientific community.

Causes

The mechanism of a paradoxical reaction has as yet (2019) not been fully clarified, in no small part due to the fact that signal transfer of single neurons in subcortical areas of the human brain is usually not accessible.

There are, however, multiple indications that paradoxical reactions upon – for example – benzodiazepines, barbiturates, inhalational anesthetics, propofol, neurosteroids, and alcohol are associated with structural deviations of GABAA receptors. The combination of the five subunits of the receptor (see image) can be altered in such a way that for example the receptor's response to GABA remains unchanged but the response to one of the named substances is dramatically different from the normal one.

References 

Clinical pharmacology
Drug-induced diseases
Health paradoxes